Erwin Frey (April 21, 1892 – 1967 or 68) was an American sculptor and educator best remembered for his George Armstrong Custer memorial.

Early life
Frey was born in Lima, Ohio, where his father, an immigrant former cabinet-maker’s apprentice from Switzerland moved after first settling in Pittsburgh.

He later studied at Lima College for a year then began his sculpture studies with Ohio sculpture Clement Barnhorn at the Cincinnati Art Academy.  While in Cincinnati he worked at the Rookwood Pottery Company.  He then moved the New York where he studied at the Beaux Arts Institute of Design and at the Art Students League with James Earle Fraser.  He helped Fraser enlarge his works used at the Panama-Pacific Exposition in 1915.  This was followed by a sojourn to Paris where he studied at the Julian Academy with Henri Bouchard and Paul Landowski.

Later life

Frey returned from Paris in 1923 to accept a position at the Columbus Art School
Frey was “Sculptor-in-residence” and a professor at Ohio State University from 1925 to 1961.

Selected works

 Beatty Memorial, Ferncliff Cemetery, Springfield, Ohio,  1924
William Beatty was an official of the Ohio Pythians for whom Frey was the Grand Keeper of Records and Seal for 31 years.
 Statue of William Oxley Thompson, The Ohio State University,  Columbus, Ohio  1930
 George Armstrong Custer monument in New Rumley, Ohio, Custer’s birthplace
 The Revolutionary Soldier and The Statesman, Ellen Phillips Samuel Memorial, Fairmount Park, Philadelphia, Pennsylvania  1943
Architectural sculpture, Indianola Middle School, Columbus, Ohio, 1929
 Christ after the Resurrection, Franklin Commons Park, Columbus, Ohio, 1955

References

1892 births
1968 deaths
Sculptors from Ohio
Ohio State University faculty